Pollock is an Atlantic fish of the genus Pollachius.

Pollock may also refer to:
 Pollock (surname), a surname (and list of people with the name)
 Jackson Pollock (1912–1956), an American painter

Places
 Pollock, Idaho, U.S.
 Pollock, Louisiana, U.S.
 Pollock, Missouri, U.S.
 Pollock, South Dakota, U.S.
 Pollock Castle, a castle in Scotland
 Pollock Halls of Residence, residence halls at University of Edinburgh, Scotland
 Pollock Halls (Penn State)
 Pollock Pines, California, U.S., a CDP

Other uses
 Pollock (film), a 2000 biography of Jackson Pollock
 Clan Pollock, a Scottish clan
 Pollock baronets, created in Nova Scotia and in the UK
 Pollock Medal, a British military award
 Benjamin Pollock's Toy Shop, in London, England
 Pollock's Toy Museum

See also 
 Alaska pollock or walleye pollock, a fish species of the cod family
 Justice Pollock (disambiguation)
 Norway pollock, a rare fish of the cod family
 
 Polack (disambiguation)
 Pollack (disambiguation)
 Polloc (disambiguation)
 Pollok (disambiguation)